Phaeophyscia endophoenicea is a species of lichen belonging to the family Physciaceae.

It is native to Europe.

References

Caliciales
Lichen species
Lichens described in 1977
Lichens of Europe